Marja Tennivaara (born 30 June 1967) is a Finnish sprinter. She competed in the women's 4 × 100 metres relay at the 1992 Summer Olympics.

References

1967 births
Living people
Athletes (track and field) at the 1992 Summer Olympics
Finnish female sprinters
Olympic athletes of Finland
Place of birth missing (living people)
Olympic female sprinters